Blind Date is an American dating game show. The show was originally hosted by Roger Lodge, and is currently hosted by Nikki Glaser.

During its syndicated years (1999-2006), the series was distributed by Universal Worldwide Television. It was later distributed by NBCUniversal Television Distribution.

Synopsis
During each episode, people who did not previously know each other at all were paired up and sent off on a blind date. The cameras followed their every move, while commentary in the form of subtitles, animations, and "thought bubbles" was added by the show's producers. The most common "type" of date on the show involved two attractive people in their 20s, one male and one female, who would do 1 or 2 activities before having dinner and (often) hanging out in a jacuzzi, after which the date would end. However, the show did a lot of variations on this theme: many episodes took place in other cities or even other countries, a lot of dates involved same-sex couples or older daters, and there would be dates that were explicitly stated to be "hot dates" or "dates from hell", which reflected the daters becoming physically intimate on the former score and furiously hating each other on the latter one. To the show's credit, it did not make alcohol available to daters who were driving themselves around, while chauffeured contestants were usually free to (and often did) drink a lot of liquor. 

From its initial 1999-2006 run, the show ended up having two couples that met on blind dates and later got married; while other couples did date for a while as documented in later "Checking In" segments, the majority of dates ended with the daters stating that there was no connection and there wouldn't be any further dates, while a decent-sized minority did have the daters state they'd like to see each other again but few of those plans were ever confirmed to have taken place.

Reboot
On October 10, 2019, it was announced that the series was getting revived and premiered on November 18, 2019, on Bravo.

Syndication
Blind Date was aired on TNN (The National Network, later Spike TV, now The Paramount Network) from 2001 to 2003. Also, Spike TV picked up the show after re-launch the new channel name, the show re-aired from 2003 to 2005. Blind Date re-aired on Fox Reality Channel from 2005 to 2010.

Some Blind Date episodes are available on Nosey.com but only a fraction of the over 1450 episodes that were produced.

See also
Blind Date (British game show)
Hell Date
Disaster Date

References

External links

1999 American television series debuts
2006 American television series endings
2019 American television series debuts
2020 American television series endings
1990s American game shows
1990s American reality television series
2000s American game shows
2000s American reality television series
2010s American game shows
2010s American reality television series
2020s American game shows
2020s American reality television series
American dating and relationship reality television series
English-language television shows
First-run syndicated television programs in the United States
Television series by Universal Television
Bravo (American TV network) original programming
American television series revived after cancellation